The 2005 Oregon State Beavers football team represented the Oregon State University in the 2005 NCAA Division I-A football season.  The team's head coach was Mike Riley.  The Beavers played their home games at Reser Stadium.

Schedule

Roster

Game summaries

Portland State

Boise State

Louisville

Arizona State

Washington State

California

#8 UCLA

Arizona

Washington

Stanford

Oregon

References

Oregon State
Oregon State Beavers football seasons
Oregon State Beavers football